Catch as Cats Can is a 1947 Warner Bros. Merrie Melodies animated cartoon directed by Arthur Davis. The short was released on December 6, 1947, and stars Sylvester.

Plot
An emaciated canary, singing like Frank Sinatra and attracting the attention of all the admiring chicks, is getting on the nerves of a pipe-puffing parrot, who speaks like Bing Crosby. The parrot spots Sylvester (with a different voice), foraging through the trash. Telling Sylvester, he needs more vitamins (which the canary has been swallowing in bulk), he lures Sylvester inside to snare the canary. 

The straightforward approach fails (the canary hits him in the left eye turning it violet). Helped by the parrot's encouragement, he carves a female canary from soap and lures Frankie there; the birds slide down a greased counter, into the sink, and down the drain, but only the soap bird goes through the pipe and down Sylvester's throat. A trail of birdseed into the garage seems to work, but Frankie jacks the cat's mouth open.  Sylvester laces the vitamins with buckshot, but the magnet attracts everything metal in sight except his prey. The canary turns Sylvester's vacuum cleaner against him, with a crash in the fireplace giving Sylvester a hot-stomach; as he buries his head in the sink, the bird adds Foamo-Seltzer to the water; the cat rockets off, crashing into a wall.

Sylvester finally realizes the portly parrot is a better meal; he is later shown sitting on the parrot's perch, imitating his mannerisms.

References

External links

1947 films
1947 animated films
1947 short films
Merrie Melodies short films
Films directed by Arthur Davis
Films scored by Carl Stalling
Sylvester the Cat films
Fictional canaries
Fictional parrots
Cultural depictions of Frank Sinatra
Cultural depictions of Bing Crosby
1940s Warner Bros. animated short films
1940s English-language films
Animated films about birds